Felix Emanuel Schelling (3 September 1858, in New Albany, Indiana – 15 December 1945) was a United States educator.

Biography
In 1881 he graduated from the University of Pennsylvania, where he received the degree of LL.B. in 1883 and that of A.M. in 1884, and of Litt.D. in 1903 and LL.D. in 1909. Beginning in 1893 he was John Welsh Centennial professor of English literature at the University of Pennsylvania. Schelling was a member of the National Institute of Arts and Letters, of the American Philosophical Society and of the Modern Language Association of America.

Publications
Literary and Verse Criticism of the Reign of Elizabeth (1891)
Life and Works of George Gascoigne (1893)
A Book of Elizabethan Lyrics (1896)
A Book of 17th Century Lyrics (1899)
The English Chronicle Play (1902)
The Queen's Progress and Other Elizabethan Sketches (1904)
History of Elizabethan Drama (1908)
English Literature during the Lifetime of Shakespeare (1910)
The Restoration Drama (Cambridge History of Literature, 1912)
The English Lyric (1913)
A History of English Drama (1914)
Shakespeare and "Demi-Science": Papers on Elizabethan Topics (1927)
He edited:
Ben Jonson, Discoveries (1892)
Eastward Ho and the Alchemist (1903)
The Merchant of Venice (1903)
Macbeth (1910)
Beaumont and Fletcher (1912)

Notes

References

External links

 

1858 births
1945 deaths
University of Pennsylvania alumni
University of Pennsylvania faculty
University of Pennsylvania Law School alumni
Presidents of the Modern Language Association